National Labor Relations Board v. Yeshiva University, 444 U.S. 672 (1980), is a US labor law case, concerning the scope of labor rights in the United States.

Facts
The Yeshiva University Faculty Association (a labor union) asked the National Labor Relations Board to be certified as the official bargaining agent for teaching and professorial staff at Yeshiva University. University management argued that the staff should not qualify as "employees" under the National Labor Relations Act 1935 §2(11) as they had sufficient supervisory authority. The staff contended that, while they managed their teaching and curriculum, they did not have effective authority over managerial power.

Judgment
A majority of the Supreme Court, 5 to 4, held that full-time professors in a university were excluded from collective bargaining rights, on the theory that they exercised "managerial" discretion in academic matters. Justice Powell delivered the majority opinion, which Chief Justice Burger, Justice Stewart, Justice Rehnquist and Justice Stevens joined.

Justice Brennan dissented (joined by Justice Marshall, Justice White and Justice Blackmun). He pointed out that management was actually in the hands of university administration, not professors.

See also

United States labor law

References

External links
 

United States labor case law
United States Supreme Court cases
United States Supreme Court cases of the Burger Court
1980 in United States case law